Beverly Armstrong [Steuert] (born September 27, 1934) is an American former female pitcher who played in the All-American Girls Professional Baseball League. She batted and threw right-handed. Sometimes she is credited as Bev Steuert.

A native of Maywood, New Jersey, Armstrong began to play at age 10 in the backyard with her father, a semi-professional baseball player who taught her how to pitch and knew all about the baseball game. She later developed a strong fastball and a decent curve.

She posted a 4–1 record in six starts and three relief appearances. Managed by Bill Allington, the Peaches featured top-notch players as Eleanor Callow, Rose Gacioch, Carol Habben, Alice Pollitt and Ruth Richard. The team advanced to the playoffs, only to lose in the first round to the Fort Wayne Daisies.

Unfortunately, in 1953 Armstrong injured an ankle midway through her second season. Due to the AAGPBL folding in 1954, before she had a chance to really play, Armstrong went on to play basketball and softball. She later married and raised three children.
 
In November 1988, the Baseball Hall of Fame and Museum in Cooperstown, New York dedicated a permanent display to the entire league. She currently lives in Kernersville, North Carolina.

Sources

All-American Girls Professional Baseball League players
Baseball players from New Jersey
People from Maywood, New Jersey
Sportspeople from Bergen County, New Jersey
1934 births
Living people
Rockford Peaches players
21st-century American women